Brooks McNiven (born June 19, 1981 in Terrace, British Columbia) is a Canadian professional baseball pitcher. He last played in the San Francisco Giants organization.

McNiven was drafted by the Giants in the 4th round of the 2003 Major League Baseball draft.

McNiven has represented Team Canada during several international baseball tournaments.  He played for Canada at the 2007 Baseball World Cup, the 2008 Summer Olympics in Beijing, and most recently was a member of the Canadian contingent at the 2009 World Baseball Classic.  However, he did not enter either of Canada's games during the tournament. He now works at rockridge secondary as a PE teacher.

References

External links

The Baseball Cube
 Olympic Canada

1981 births
Living people
Baseball pitchers
Baseball people from British Columbia
Canadian expatriate baseball players in the United States
Connecticut Defenders players
Fresno Grizzlies players
People from Terrace, British Columbia
Salem-Keizer Volcanoes players
San Jose Giants players
UBC Thunderbirds baseball players
World Baseball Classic players of Canada
2009 World Baseball Classic players